Bew and Bews are English-language surnames.

People who share these names include:

Bew
John Bew (disambiguation), several people, including
John Bew (bookseller) (1774–1793), bookseller and publisher in London
John Bew (historian), professor of history
Kieran Bew (born 1980), English actor
Paul Bew aka Baron Bew (born 1950), British historian

Bews
Andrew Bews (born 1964), Australian rules footballer with Brisbane Bears
David Bews (1850–1891), South Australian politician
Jed Bews (born 1993), Australian rules footballer with Geelong
John Bews (1884—1938), South African botanist
Mary Ellen Bews (1856–1945), New Zealand school principal